Gvazda is a rural locality (a selo) and the administrative center of Gvazdenskoye Rural Settlement, Buturlinovsky District, Voronezh Oblast, Russia. The population was 2,508 as of 2010. There are 27 streets.

Geography 
Gvazda is located 14 km southwest of Buturlinovka (the district's administrative centre) by road. Klyopovka is the nearest rural locality.

References 

Rural localities in Buturlinovsky District